

Events

Pre-1600
 748 – Abbasid Revolution: The Hashimi rebels under Abu Muslim Khorasani take Merv, capital of the Umayyad province Khorasan, marking the consolidation of the Abbasid revolt.
 842 – Charles the Bald and Louis the German swear the Oaths of Strasbourg in the French and German languages.
1014 – Pope Benedict VIII crowns Henry of Bavaria, King of Germany and of Italy, as Holy Roman Emperor.
1130 – The troubled 1130 papal election exposes a rift within the College of Cardinals.
1349 – Several hundred Jews are burned to death by mobs while the remaining Jews are forcibly removed from Strasbourg.
1530 – Spanish conquistadores, led by Nuño de Guzmán, overthrow and execute Tangaxuan II, the last independent monarch of the Tarascan state in present-day central Mexico.
1556 – Having been declared a heretic and laicized by Pope Paul IV on 4 December 1555, Archbishop of Canterbury Thomas Cranmer is publicly defrocked at Christ Church Cathedral.
  1556   – Coronation of Akbar as ruler of the Mughal Empire.

1601–1900
1613 – Wedding of Princess Elizabeth and Frederick V of the Palatinate at Whitehall Palace, London.
1655 – The Mapuches launch coordinated attacks against the Spanish in Chile beginning the Mapuche uprising of 1655.
1779 – American Revolutionary War: The Battle of Kettle Creek is fought in Georgia.
  1779   – James Cook is killed by Native Hawaiians near Kealakekua on the Island of Hawaii.
1797 – French Revolutionary Wars: Battle of Cape St. Vincent: John Jervis, (later 1st Earl of St Vincent) and Horatio Nelson (later 1st Viscount Nelson) lead the British Royal Navy to victory over a Spanish fleet in action near Gibraltar.
1804 – Karađorđe leads the First Serbian Uprising against the Ottoman Empire.
1831 – Ras Marye of Yejju marches into Tigray and defeats and kills Dejazmach Sabagadis in the Battle of Debre Abbay.
1835 – The original Quorum of the Twelve Apostles, in the Latter Day Saint movement, is formed in Kirtland, Ohio.
1849 – In New York City, James Knox Polk becomes the first serving President of the United States to have his photograph taken.
1852 – Great Ormond St Hospital for Sick Children, the first hospital in England to provide in-patient beds specifically for children, is founded in London.
1855 – Texas is linked by telegraph to the rest of the United States, with the completion of a connection between New Orleans and Marshall, Texas.
1859 – Oregon is admitted as the 33rd U.S. state.
1876 – Alexander Graham Bell applies for a patent for the telephone, as does Elisha Gray.
1879 – The War of the Pacific breaks out when the Chilean Army occupies the Bolivian port city of Antofagasta.
1899 – Voting machines are approved by the U.S. Congress for use in federal elections.
1900 – The British Army begins the Battle of the Tugela Heights in an effort to lift the Siege of Ladysmith.

1901–present
1903 – The United States Department of Commerce and Labor is established (later split into the Department of Commerce and the Department of Labor).
1912 – Arizona is admitted as the 48th and the last contiguous U.S. state.
  1912   – The U.S. Navy commissions its first class of diesel-powered submarines.
1918 – Russia adopts the Gregorian calendar.
1919 – The Polish–Soviet War begins.
1920 – The League of Women Voters is founded in Chicago.
1924 – The Computing-Tabulating-Recording Company changes its name to International Business Machines Corporation (IBM).
1929 – Saint Valentine's Day Massacre: Seven people, six of them gangster rivals of Al Capone's gang, are murdered in Chicago.
1939 – World War II: German battleship Bismarck is launched.
1942 – World War II: Battle of Pasir Panjang contributes to the fall of Singapore.
1943 – World War II: Rostov-on-Don, Russia is liberated.
  1943   – World War II: Tunisia Campaign: General Hans-Jürgen von Arnim's Fifth Panzer Army launches a counter-attack against Allied positions in Tunisia.
1944 – World War II: In the action of 14 February 1944, a Royal Navy submarine sinks a German-controlled Italian Regia Marina submarine in the Strait of Malacca.
1945 – World War II: On the first day of the bombing of Dresden, the British Royal Air Force and the United States Army Air Forces begin fire-bombing Dresden.
  1945   – World War II: Navigational error leads to the mistaken bombing of Prague, Czechoslovakia by a United States Army Air Forces squadron of B-17s assisting in the Soviet Red Army's Vistula–Oder Offensive.
  1945   – World War II: Mostar is liberated by Yugoslav partisans 
1946 – The Bank of England is nationalized.
1949 – The Knesset (parliament of Israel) convenes for the first time.
  1949   – The Asbestos Strike begins in Canada. The strike marks the beginning of the Quiet Revolution in Quebec.
1961 – Discovery of the chemical elements: Element 103, Lawrencium, is first synthesized at the University of California.
1966 – Australian currency is decimalized.
1979 – In Kabul, Setami Milli militants kidnap the American ambassador to Afghanistan, Adolph Dubs who is later killed during a gunfight between his kidnappers and police.
1983 – United American Bank of Knoxville, Tennessee collapses. Its president, Jake Butcher, is later convicted of fraud.
1989 – Union Carbide agrees to pay $470 million to the Indian government for damages it caused in the 1984 Bhopal disaster.
  1989   – Iranian leader Ruhollah Khomeini issues a fatwa encouraging Muslims to kill Salman Rushdie, author of The Satanic Verses.
1990 – Ninety-two people are killed when Indian Airlines Flight 605 crashes in Bangalore, India.
  1990   – The Voyager 1 spacecraft takes the photograph of planet Earth that later becomes famous as Pale Blue Dot.
1998 – An oil tanker train collides with a freight train in Yaoundé, Cameroon, spilling fuel oil. One person scavenging the oil created a massive explosion which killed 120.
2000 – The spacecraft NEAR Shoemaker enters orbit around asteroid 433 Eros, the first spacecraft to orbit an asteroid.
2003 – Iraq disarmament crisis: UNMOVIC Executive Chairman Hans Blix reports to the United Nations Security Council that disarmament inspectors have found no weapons of mass destruction in Ba'athist Iraq. 
2004 – In a suburb of Moscow, Russia, the roof of the Transvaal water park collapses, killing more than 28 people, and wounding 193 others.
2005 – In Beirut, 23 people, including former Prime Minister Rafic Hariri, are killed when the equivalent of around 1,000 kg of TNT is detonated while Hariri's motorcade drives through the city.
  2005   – Seven people are killed and 151 wounded in a series of bombings by suspected al-Qaeda-linked militants that hit Makati, Davao City, and General Santos, all in the Philippines.
  2005   – YouTube is launched by a group of college students, eventually becoming the largest video sharing website in the world and a main source for viral videos.
2008 – Northern Illinois University shooting: A gunman opens fire in a lecture hall of Northern Illinois University in DeKalb County, Illinois, resulting in six fatalities (including the gunman) and 21 injuries.
2011 – As a part of Arab Spring, the Bahraini uprising begins with a 'Day of Rage'.
2018 – Jacob Zuma resigns as President of South Africa.
  2018   – A shooting at Marjory Stoneman Douglas High School in Parkland, Florida is one of the deadliest school massacres with 17 fatalities and 17 injuries.
2019 – Pulwama attack takes place in Lethpora in Pulwama district, Jammu and Kashmir, India in which 40 Central Reserve Police Force personnel and a suicide bomber were killed and 35 were injured.

Births

Pre-1600
1404 – Leon Battista Alberti, Italian painter, poet, and philosopher (d. 1472)
1408 – John FitzAlan, 14th Earl of Arundel (d. 1435)
1452 – Pandolfo Petrucci, tyrant of Siena (d. 1512)
1468 – Johannes Werner, German priest and mathematician (d. 1522)
1483 – Babur, Moghul emperor (d. 1530)
1490 – Valentin Friedland, German scholar and educationist of the Reformation (d. 1556)
1513 – Domenico Ferrabosco, Italian composer (d. 1573)
1545 – Lucrezia de' Medici, Duchess of Ferrara (d. 1561)

1601–1900
1602 – Francesco Cavalli, Italian composer (d. 1676)
1614 – John Wilkins, English bishop, academic and natural philosopher (d. 1672)
1625 – Countess Palatine Maria Euphrosyne of Zweibrücken, Swedish princess (d. 1687)
1628 – Valentine Greatrakes, Irish faith healer (d. 1683)
1640 – Countess Palatine Anna Magdalena of Birkenfeld-Bischweiler (d. 1693)
1670 – Rajaram Raj Bhonsle, third Chhatrapati of the Maratha Empire (d. 1700)
1679 – Georg Friedrich Kauffmann, German organist and composer (d. 1735)
1692 – Pierre-Claude Nivelle de La Chaussée, French author and playwright (d. 1754)
1701 – Enrique Flórez, Spanish historian and author (d. 1773)
1763 – Jean Victor Marie Moreau, French general (d. 1813)
1782 – Eleanora Atherton, English philanthropist (d. 1870)
1784 – Heinrich Baermann, German clarinetist (d. 1847)
1799 – Walenty Wańkowicz, Polish painter and illustrator (d. 1842)
1800 – Emory Washburn, American historian, lawyer, and politician, 22nd Governor of Massachusetts (d. 1877)
1808 – Michael Costa, Italian-English conductor and composer (d. 1884)
1812 – Fernando Wood, American merchant and politician, 73rd Mayor of New York City (d. 1881)
1813 – Lydia Hamilton Smith, African-American businesswoman (d. 1884)
1819 – Christopher Latham Sholes, American journalist and politician, invented the typewriter (d. 1890)
1824 – Winfield Scott Hancock, American general and politician (d. 1886)
1828 – Edmond François Valentin About, French journalist and author (d. 1885)
1835 – Piet Paaltjens, Dutch minister and poet (d. 1894)
1838 – Margaret E. Knight, American inventor (d. 1914)
1846 – Julian Scott, American soldier and drummer, Medal of Honor recipient (d. 1901)
1847 – Anna Howard Shaw, American physician, minister, and activist (d. 1919)
1848 – Benjamin Baillaud, French astronomer and academic (d. 1934)
1855 – Frank Harris, Irish author and journalist (d. 1931)
1859 – George Washington Gale Ferris Jr., American engineer, inventor of the Ferris wheel (d. 1896)
1860 – Eugen Schiffer, German lawyer and politician, Vice-Chancellor of Germany (d. 1954)
1869 – Charles Thomson Rees Wilson, Scottish physicist and meteorologist, Nobel Prize laureate (d. 1959)
1878 – Julius Nieuwland, Belgian priest, chemist and academic (d. 1936)
1882 – John Barrymore, American actor (d. 1942)
1884 – Nils Olaf Chrisander, Swedish actor and director (d. 1947)
  1884   – Kostas Varnalis, Greek poet and playwright (d. 1974)
1888 – Chandrashekhar Agashe, Indian industrialist (d. 1956)
1890 – Nina Hamnett, Welsh-English painter and author (d. 1956)
  1890   – Dick Richards, Welsh international footballer (d. 1934)
1891 – Katherine Stinson, American aviator (d. 1977)
1892 – Radola Gajda, Czech commander and politician (d. 1948)
1894 – Jack Benny, American actor and producer (d. 1974)
1895 – Wilhelm Burgdorf, German general (d. 1945)
  1895   – Max Horkheimer, German philosopher and sociologist (d. 1973)
1898 – Bill Tilman, English mountaineer and explorer (d. 1977)
  1898   – Fritz Zwicky, Swiss-American physicist and astronomer (d. 1974)
1900 – Jessica Dragonette, American singer (d. 1980)

1901–present
1903 – Stuart Erwin, American actor (d. 1967)
1905 – Thelma Ritter, American actress and singer (d. 1969)
1907 – Johnny Longden, English-American jockey and trainer (d. 2003)
1911 – Willem Johan Kolff, Dutch physician and inventor (d. 2009)
1912 – Tibor Sekelj, Hungarian lawyer, explorer, and author (d. 1988)
1913 – Mel Allen, American sportscaster (d. 1996)
  1913   – Woody Hayes, American football player and coach (d. 1987)
  1913   – Jimmy Hoffa, American trade union leader (d. 1975)
  1913   – James Pike, American bishop (d. 1969)
1915 – Sally Gray, English actress and singer (d. 2006)
1916 – Marcel Bigeard, French general (d. 2010)
  1916   – Masaki Kobayashi, Japanese director and producer (d. 1996)
  1916   – Edward Platt, American actor (d. 1974)
1917 – Herbert A. Hauptman, American mathematician and academic, Nobel Prize laureate (d. 2011)
1921 – Hugh Downs, American journalist, game show host, and producer (d. 2020)
  1921   – Hazel McCallion, Canadian businesswoman and politician, 3rd Mayor of Mississauga (d. 2023)
1923 – Jay Hebert, American golfer (d. 1997)
1924 – Patricia Knatchbull, 2nd Countess Mountbatten of Burma (d. 2017)
  1924   – Juan Ponce Enrile, Filipino politician
1927 – Lois Maxwell, Canadian-Australian model and actress (d. 2007)
1928 – William Allain, American lawyer and politician, 58th Governor of Mississippi (d. 2013)
  1928   – Vicente T. Blaz, American general and politician (d. 2014)
1929 – Vic Morrow, American actor and director (d. 1982)
1931 – Bernie Geoffrion, Canadian-American ice hockey player and coach (d. 2006)
  1931   – Brian Kelly, American actor and director (d. 2005)
1932 – Harriet Andersson, Swedish actress
1934 – Florence Henderson, American actress and singer (d. 2016)
1935 – David Wilson, Baron Wilson of Tillyorn, Scottish academic and diplomat, 27th Governor of Hong Kong
1936 – Anna German, Polish singer (d. 1982)
1937 – John MacGregor, Baron MacGregor of Pulham Market, English politician, Secretary of State for Transport
  1937   – Magic Sam, American singer and guitarist (d. 1969)
1939 – Razzy Bailey, American country music singer-songwriter and musician (d. 2021)
  1939   – Blowfly, American singer-songwriter and producer (d. 2016)
  1939   – Eugene Fama, American economist and academic, Nobel Prize laureate
1941 – Donna Shalala, American academic and politician, 18th United States Secretary of Health and Human Services
  1941   – Paul Tsongas, American lawyer and politician (d. 1997)
1942 – Michael Bloomberg, American businessman and politician, 108th Mayor of New York City
  1942   – Andrew Robinson, American actor and director
  1942   – Ricardo Rodríguez, Mexican racing driver (d. 1962)
1943 – Maceo Parker, American saxophonist
1944 – Carl Bernstein, American journalist and author
  1944   – Alan Parker, English director, producer, and screenwriter (d. 2020)
  1944   – Ronnie Peterson, Swedish racing driver (d. 1978)
1945 – Hans-Adam II, Prince of Liechtenstein
  1945   – Rod Masterson, American lieutenant and actor (d. 2013)
1946 – Bernard Dowiyogo, Nauru politician, President of Nauru (d. 2003)
  1946   – Gregory Hines, American actor, singer, and dancer (d. 2003)
1947 – Tim Buckley, American singer-songwriter and guitarist (d. 1975)
  1947   – Judd Gregg, American lawyer and politician, 76th Governor of New Hampshire
  1947   – Phạm Tuân, Vietnamese aviator and cosmonaut
1948 – Kitten Natividad, Mexican-American actress and dancer (d. 2022)
  1948   – Pat O'Brien, American journalist and author
  1948   – Wally Tax, Dutch singer-songwriter (d. 2005)
  1948   – Teller, American magician and actor
1950 – Roger Fisher, American guitarist and songwriter 
1951 – Terry Gross, American radio host and producer
  1951   – Kevin Keegan, English footballer and manager
1952 – Sushma Swaraj, Indian lawyer and politician, Indian Minister of External Affairs (d. 2019)
1954 – Jam Mohammad Yousaf, Pakistani politician, Chief Minister of Balochistan (d. 2013)
1955 – Carol Kalish, American publisher (d. 1991)
1956 – Howard Davis Jr., American boxer and trainer (d. 2015)
  1956   – Dave Dravecky, American baseball player
  1956   – Katharina Fritsch, German sculptor and academic
1957 – Soile Isokoski, Finnish soprano and actress
  1957   – Alan Smith, English bishop
1958 – Grant Thomas, Australian footballer and coach
1959 – Renée Fleming, American soprano and actress
1960 – Philip Jones, English admiral
  1960   – Jim Kelly, American football player and businessman
  1960   – Meg Tilly, American actress and author
1963 – Enrico Colantoni, Canadian actor, director, and producer
  1963   – John Marzano, American baseball player (d. 2008)
1964 – Gianni Bugno, Italian cyclist and sportscaster
1966 – Petr Svoboda, Czech ice hockey player and agent
1967 – Stelios Haji-Ioannou, Greek-English businessman, founded easyJet
  1967   – Manuela Maleeva, Bulgarian-Swiss tennis player
  1967   – Mark Rutte, Dutch businessman and politician, Prime Minister of the Netherlands
1968 – Jules Asner, American model and television host
  1968   – Chris Lewis, Guyanese-English cricketer
  1968   – Scott McClellan, American civil servant and author, 25th White House Press Secretary
1969 – Meg Hillier, English journalist and politician, Shadow Secretary of State for Energy and Climate Change
1970 – Giuseppe Guerini, Italian cyclist
  1970   – Sean Hill, American ice hockey player
  1970   – Simon Pegg, English actor, director, and producer
1971 – Kris Aquino, Filipino talk show host, actress, and producer
  1971   – Gheorghe Mureșan, Romanian basketball player
1972 – Drew Bledsoe, American football player and coach
  1972   – Musōyama Masashi, Japanese sumo wrestler
  1972   – Najwa Nimri, Spanish actress and singer 
  1972   – Jaan Tallinn, Estonian computer programmer, co-developed Skype
  1972   – Rob Thomas, American singer-songwriter 
1973 – H. D. Ackerman, South African cricketer
  1973   – Tyus Edney, American basketball player and coach
  1973   – Steve McNair, American football player (d. 2009)
  1973   – Annalisa Buffa, Italian mathematician
1974 – Valentina Vezzali, Italian fencer and politician
1976 – Liv Kristine, Norwegian singer-songwriter
  1976   – Rie Rasmussen, Danish model, film director, writer, photographer, and actress
1977 – Cadel Evans, Australian cyclist
  1977   – Jim Jefferies, Australian comedian and actor
  1977   – Darren Purse, English footballer
  1977   – Elmer Symons, South African motorcycle racer (d. 2007)
  1977   – Anna Erschler, Russian mathematician
  1977   – Robert J. Jackson Jr., American law professor
1978 – Richard Hamilton, American basketball player
  1978   – Darius Songaila, Lithuanian basketball player and coach
1980 – Josh Senter, American screenwriter and producer
  1980   – Michelle Ye, Hong Kong actress and producer
1981 – Matteo Brighi, Italian footballer
  1981   – Randy de Puniet, French motorcycle racer
  1981   – Brad Halsey, American baseball player (d. 2014)
1982 – Marián Gáborík, Slovak ice hockey player
  1982   – John Halls, English footballer and model
  1982   – Lenka Tvarošková, Slovak tennis player
1983 – Callix Crabbe, Virgin Islander baseball player
  1983   – Rocky Elsom, Australian rugby player
  1983   – Bacary Sagna, French footballer
1985 – Karima Adebibe, English model and actress
  1985   – Tyler Clippard, American baseball player
  1985   – Heart Evangelista, Filipino singer and actress
  1985   – Philippe Senderos, Swiss international footballer
  1985   – Miki Yeung, Hong Kong singer and actress 
1986 – Michael Ammermüller, German racing driver
  1986   – Oliver Lee, English actor, director, and screenwriter
  1986   – Gao Lin, Chinese footballer
1987 – Edinson Cavani, Uruguayan footballer
  1987   – Tom Pyatt, Canadian ice hockey player
  1987   – David Wheater, English footballer
1988 – Katie Boland, Canadian actress, producer, and screenwriter
  1988   – Ángel Di María, Argentinian footballer
  1988   – Siim Liivik, Estonian ice hockey player
1989 – Néstor Calderón, Mexican footballer
  1989   – Adam Matuszczyk, Polish footballer
  1989   – Emma Miskew, Canadian curler
  1989   – Brandon Sutter, Canadian ice hockey player
  1989   – Jurij Tepeš, Slovenian ski jumper
  1989   – Kristian Thomas, English gymnast
1990 – Chris Babb, American basketball player
  1990   – Sefa Yılmaz, German-Turkish footballer
1991 – Daniela Mona Lambin, Estonian footballer
1992 – Christian Eriksen, Danish footballer
  1992   – Freddie Highmore, English actor
1996 – Lucas Hernandez, French footballer
1997 – Jaehyun, South Korean singer and actor

Deaths

Pre-1600
 869 – Cyril, Greek missionary bishop (b. 827)
 945 – Lian Chongyu, Chinese general
   945   – Zhu Wenjin, Chinese emperor
1009 – Bruno of Querfurt, German missionary bishop
1010 – Fujiwara no Korechika, Japanese nobleman (b. 974)
1140 – Leo I, Armenian prince
  1140   – Sobĕslav I, duke of Bohemia
1164 – Sviatoslav Olgovich, Kievan prince
1229 – Rǫgnvaldr Guðrøðarson, king of the Isles
1317 – Margaret of France, queen of England
1400 – Richard II, king of England (b. 1367)
1440 – Dietrich of Oldenburg, German nobleman
1489 – Nicolaus von Tüngen, prince-bishop of Warmia
1528 – Edzard I, German nobleman (b. 1462)
1549 – Il Sodoma, Italian painter (b. 1477)
1571 – Odet de Coligny, French cardinal (b. 1517)

1601–1900
1676 – Abraham Bosse, French engraver and illustrator (b. 1602)
1714 – Maria Luisa of Savoy, queen of Spain (b. 1688)
1737 – Charles Talbot, 1st Baron Talbot, English lawyer and politician Lord Chancellor of Great Britain (b. 1685)
1744 – John Hadley, English mathematician, invented the octant (b. 1682)
1779 – James Cook, English captain, cartographer, and explorer (b. 1728)
1780 – William Blackstone, English jurist and politician (b. 1723)
1782 – Singu Min, Burmese king (b. 1756)
1808 – John Dickinson, American lawyer and politician 5th Governor of Delaware (b. 1732)
1831 – Vicente Guerrero, Mexican general and politician, 2nd President of Mexico (b. 1782)
  1831   – Henry Maudslay, English engineer (b. 1771)
1870 – St. John Richardson Liddell, American general (b. 1815)
1881 – Fernando Wood, American merchant and politician, 73rd Mayor of New York City (b. 1812)
1884 – Lydia Hamilton Smith, African-American businesswoman (b. 1813)
1885 – Jules Vallès, French journalist and author (b. 1832)
1891 – William Tecumseh Sherman, American general (b. 1820)
1894 – Eugène Charles Catalan, Belgian-French mathematician and academic (b. 1814)

1901–present
1901 – Edward Stafford, Scottish-New Zealand educator and politician, 3rd Prime Minister of New Zealand (b. 1819)
1910 – Giovanni Passannante, Italian anarchist (b. 1849)
1922 – Heikki Ritavuori, Finnish lawyer and politician (b. 1880; assassinated)
1929 – Thomas Burke, American sprinter, coach, and lawyer (b. 1875)
1930 – Thomas Mackenzie, Scottish-New Zealand cartographer and politician, 18th Prime Minister of New Zealand (b. 1853)
1933 – Carl Correns, German botanist and geneticist (b. 1864)
1937 – Erkki Melartin, Finnish composer (b. 1875)
1942 – Adnan Saidi, Malayan lieutenant (b. 1915)
1943 – Dora Gerson, German actress and singer (b. 1899)
  1943   – David Hilbert, Russian-German mathematician, physicist, and philosopher (b. 1862)
1948 – Mordecai Brown, American baseball player and manager (b. 1876)
1949 – Yusuf Salman Yusuf, Iraqi politician (b. 1901)
1950 – Karl Guthe Jansky, American physicist and engineer (b. 1905)
1952 – Maurice De Waele, Belgian cyclist (b. 1896)
1958 – Abdur Rab Nishtar, Pakistani politician, 2nd Governor of Punjab (b. 1899)
1959 – Baby Dodds, American drummer (b. 1898)
1967 – Sig Ruman, German-American actor (b. 1884)
1969 – Vito Genovese, Italian-American mob boss (b. 1897)
1970 – Herbert Strudwick, English cricketer and coach (b. 1880)
1974 – Stewie Dempster, New Zealand cricketer and coach (b. 1903)
1975 – Julian Huxley, English biologist and eugenicist, co-founded the World Wide Fund for Nature (b. 1887)
  1975   – P. G. Wodehouse, English novelist and playwright (b. 1881)
1976 – Gertrud Dorka, German archaeologist, prehistorian and museum director (born 1893)
1979 – Adolph Dubs, American lieutenant and diplomat, United States Ambassador to Afghanistan (b. 1920)
1983 – Lina Radke, German runner and coach (b. 1903)
1986 – Edmund Rubbra, English composer and conductor (b. 1901)
1987 – Dmitry Kabalevsky, Russian pianist and composer (b. 1904)
1988 – Frederick Loewe, German-American composer (b. 1901)
1989 – James Bond, American ornithologist and zoologist (b. 1900)
  1989   – Vincent Crane, English pianist (b. 1943)
1994 – Andrei Chikatilo, Soviet serial killer (b. 1936)
  1994   – Christopher Lasch, American historian and critic (b. 1932)
1995 – Michael V. Gazzo, American actor and playwright (b. 1923)
  1995   – U Nu, Burmese politician, 1st Prime Minister of Burma (b. 1907)
1996 – Bob Paisley, English footballer and manager (b. 1919)
1998 – Peter Koch (wood scientist), American industrial engineer and wood scientist (b. 1920)
1999 – John Ehrlichman, American lawyer and politician, 12th White House Counsel (b. 1925)
  1999   – Buddy Knox, American singer-songwriter and guitarist (b. 1933)
2002 – Nándor Hidegkuti, Hungarian footballer and manager (b. 1922)
  2002   – Mick Tucker, English drummer (b. 1947)
2003 – Johnny Longden, English jockey and trainer (b. 1907)
2004 – Marco Pantani, Italian cyclist (b. 1970)
2005 – Rafic Hariri, Lebanese businessman and politician, 60th Prime Minister of Lebanon (b. 1944; assassinated)
2006 – Lynden David Hall, English singer-songwriter and producer (b. 1974)
2007 – Ryan Larkin, Canadian animator and director (b. 1943)
  2007   – Gareth Morris, English flute player and educator (b. 1920)
2009 – Bernard Ashley, English engineer and businessman, co-founded Laura Ashley plc (b. 1926)
  2009   – Louie Bellson, American drummer and composer (b. 1924)
2010 – Doug Fieger, American singer-songwriter and guitarist (b. 1952)
  2010   – Dick Francis, Welsh jockey and author (b. 1920)
  2010   – Linnart Mäll, Estonian historian, orientalist, and translator (b. 1938)
2011 – George Shearing, English-American pianist and composer (b. 1919)
2012 – Mike Bernardo, South African boxer and martial artist (b. 1969)
  2012   – Tonmi Lillman, Finnish drummer and producer (b. 1973)
  2012   – Dory Previn, American singer-songwriter (b. 1925)
  2012   – Péter Rusorán, Hungarian swimmer, water polo player, and coach (b. 1940)
2013 – Glenn Boyer, American historian and author (b. 1924)
  2013   – Ronald Dworkin, American philosopher and scholar (b. 1931)
2014 – Tom Finney, English footballer (b. 1922)
  2014   – Chris Pearson, Canadian lawyer and politician, 1st Premier of Yukon (b. 1931)
  2014   – Mike Stepovich, American lawyer and politician, Governor of Alaska Territory (b. 1919)
2015 – Louis Jourdan, French-American actor and singer (b. 1921)
  2015   – Philip Levine, American poet and academic (b. 1928)
  2015   – Franjo Mihalić, Croatian-Serbian runner and coach (b. 1920)
2016 – Eric Lubbock, 4th Baron Avebury, English lieutenant, engineer, and politician (b. 1928)
  2016   – Steven Stucky, American composer and academic (b. 1949)
2018 – Ruud Lubbers, Dutch politician and diplomat, Prime Minister and United Nations High Commissioner for Refugees (b. 1939)
  2018   – Morgan Tsvangirai, 2nd Prime Minister of Zimbabwe (b. 1952)
2021 – Carlos Menem, Argentine former president, lawyer, and statesman (b. 1930)
  2021   – William Meninger, American Trappist monk and a principal developer of Centering Prayer (b. 1932)

Holidays and observances
 Christian feast day:
 Cyril and Methodius, patron saints of Europe (Roman Catholic Church)
 Manchan
 Valentine (see also Valentine's Day)
 February 14 (Eastern Orthodox liturgics)
 Statehood Day (Arizona, United States)
 Statehood Day (Oregon, United States)
 Presentation of Jesus at the Temple (Armenian Apostolic Church)
 Parents' Worship Day (parts of India)

References

External links

 BBC: On This Day
 
 Historical Events on February 14

Days of the year
February